Mary Ann Nevins Radzinowicz (born April 18, 1925) is an American academic and scholar of English literature. She is a leading authority on John Milton and 17th century English literature. She is Jacob Gould Schurman Professor of English Literature Emerita at Cornell University.

Career
She read English at Radcliffe College and took her M.A. and PhD degrees at Columbia University. She was awarded two Fulbright Scholarships to attend the University of Cambridge, where she took a further M. A. degree.  She was a Fellow of Girton College, Cambridge and lecturer in English at the University of Cambridge for 20 years. From 1980, she was Jacob Gould Schurman Professor of English Literature at Cornell University where she specialised in literary criticism in a historical context. She retired in 1990 and moved to live in Ballyvaughan, County Clare, Ireland.

Works
Her best known-book is the magisterial Toward Samson Agonistes: The Growth of Milton's Mind (1978); it was followed by Milton's Epics and the Book of Psalms (1989), both published by Princeton University Press. She has also written scholarly articles including the influential "Milton and the Tragic Women of Genesis" in 1995. She has also edited a number of books including American Colonial Prose: John Smith to Thomas Jefferson (1984, Cambridge University Press) She is most associated with her work on Milton and 17th century English literature.

Awards and honours
She was awarded the Guggenheim Fellowship in 1982 for her research on Milton's epics and the Book of Psalms: the fellowship is awarded to those "who have demonstrated exceptional capacity for productive scholarship or exceptional creative ability in the arts".

In 1987 the Milton Society of American named her an Honored Scholar.
 
In 2012, she was honoured with a Festschrift, Milton's Rival Hermeneutics: 'Reason Is But Choosing' (edited by Richard J. DuRocher and Margaret Olofson Thickstun, Duquesne University Press, 2012).

Personal life
While working in Cambridge she married in 1958 Sir Leon Radzinowicz, Wolfson Professor of Criminology at Cambridge and founder of the Cambridge Institute of Criminology. They divorced in 1979. As her husband was knighted in 1970, she was formally Lady Radzinowicz. Their two children, Ann and William, live and work in London.

References 

1925 births
Living people
Cornell University faculty
Fellows of Girton College, Cambridge
Columbia University alumni
Radcliffe College alumni
People from Ballyvaughan
American expatriates in the United Kingdom